Terrence Richard Ley (born 21 February 1947, Portland, Oregon) is a retired baseball pitcher who began his career in the  season for the New York Yankees.  He was a student of University of Oregon before he was drafted in the 3rd round of the January 1967 draft and was 24 when he made his major league debut on August 20, 1971 for the Yankees.  He played in 6 major league games.

Career
Ley attended Madison High School in Portland, Oregon. He was initially drafted by the Detroit Tigers in the 30th round of the 1965 Major League Baseball draft, but chose not to sign. He attended the University of Oregon, where he played college baseball for the Oregon Ducks baseball team. After his freshman year, he transferred to Clark College in Vancouver, Washington.

The New York Yankees drafted Ley in the third round of the January Secondary draft in 1967, and he signed. He made his Major League Baseball debut in 1971. Both he and Gary Jones were traded twice on the same day at the Winter Meetings on December 2, 1971. They were first sent from the Yankees to the Texas Rangers for Bernie Allen, then along with Del Unser and Denny Riddleberger to the Cleveland Indians for Roy Foster, Rich Hand, Mike Paul and Ken Suarez.

Ley was the first pitcher in NPB history to issue three balks in an inning, doing so in 1974.

References

External links

1947 births
Living people
Major League Baseball pitchers
New York Yankees players
American expatriate baseball players in Japan
Nippon Ham Fighters players
Baseball players from Portland, Oregon
Hawaii Islanders players
Fort Lauderdale Yankees players
Kinston Eagles players
Manchester Yankees players
Portland Beavers players
Oklahoma City 89ers players
Oregon Ducks baseball players
Leodis V. McDaniel High School alumni